Who Wants to Be a Millionaire? is an Australian television game show which would offer a maximum cash prize of $1,000,000 for answering 15 successive multiple-choice questions of increasing difficulty. The show was based on and follows the same general format of the original version of the show from the United Kingdom, and is part of the international Who Wants to Be a Millionaire? franchise.

History 
Who Wants to Be a Millionaire? Debuted in Australia on 18 April 1999 on the Nine Network and was hosted by Eddie McGuire.

Beginning with an eleven-question format starting at $1,000, this was later changed to the standard 15-question format and offered a top prize of $1 million. In the 2007 revision of the show, the new maximum prize money on offer is $5 million; however, in the 2010 revision the top prize reverted to $1 million. The show ran in the Monday 8:30 pm time slot between 1999 and 2006 except for a brief two-week period in 2004 where a shortened half-hour edition was put up against Seven's Deal or No Deal in the 5:30 pm time slot leading into the 6:00 pm evening news. This move was designed specifically to arrest declining ratings in Nine's Sydney market, where its once-dominant news bulletin was starting to be challenged by the rival Seven News in the ratings. This incarnation turned out to be a ratings failure, and it lasted for only one week.

This was the first country to have a fastest-finger round where two people answered the fastest at the same time. As a result, another question was asked but neither of them got it right, so a third question was asked. The fastest finger later on, instead of giving out one answer, two answers had to be given out to avoid any random guessing from happening. Later still, the contestants playing the fastest finger had to rank the four options in the correct order (as per the question), to avoid people winning Fastest Finger on a guess.

In the first few seasons, some questions often had a joke answer for the D choice (as with the US version of the show), for example, the question "The 80s band with the hit song 'Relax' was Frankie goes to... where?" had Collingwood offered as a D joke (this being a reference to Eddie McGuire being president of the Collingwood Football Club). As well, the Fastest Finger First segment from 1999 until 2003 required the ten contestants to give a correct answer as quickly as possible before reverting to the international standard of rules in 2004 where contestants had to order the four options in a row.

The 11 March 2002 episode of Who Wants to Be a Millionaire? scored a national audience of 1.51 million, just under 200,000 more than what The Weakest Link: The Mole Special achieved on the same night.

In April 2003, the British episode in which Charles Ingram cheated all the way to the top prize was aired on the Nine Network, featuring Ingram's run in its entirety, and watched by over two million Australians. At the time, the Australian version did both has two top prize winners. In 2001, an episode featuring Survivor winner Richard Hatch incorrectly answering his fourth question (see below) was also shown in the United States.

On 9 February 2006, it was announced that McGuire would become the new CEO of the Nine Network, filling a vacancy created by the departure of David Gyngell in May 2005. As a result of this, McGuire had to sacrifice his on-air commitments. However, unlike The AFL Footy Show where McGuire was replaced with Garry Lyon and James Brayshaw, the network could not find a suitable replacement. The final episode aired on 3 April 2006. The last contestant was Mr. Tony Egan of Wagga Wagga, NSW, who won $32,000.

Spin-offs 
On 29 January 2007, McGuire returned to working in front of the camera, hosting the Australian version of the quiz show, 1 vs. 100. This was followed up with McGuire announcing on 18 May 2007 that he would be resigning as CEO of the Nine Network, and would be taking on a new position in programming services, as well as more on-screen roles. With the resignation officially taking effect on 30 June 2007, McGuire continued hosting 1 vs. 100 until poor ratings forced the hiatus of the program in October 2007.

On 20 August, it was announced that Nine's nightly quiz show Temptation would be rested for the remainder of the year and replaced with nightly half-hour editions of Millionaire to be aired between 7:00 and 7:30 pm However, with the return of David Gyngell to the CEO role in September he immediately announced that a new version of Who Wants to Be a Millionaire? would be broadcast live to air from 7:00 pm for 90 minutes on Monday night and that Temptation would be run on Tuesday to Friday nights from 7:00 pm.

2007 format 
While this version is very similar to the original, with the program's return comes an additional lifeline which is obtained once a contestant reaches the second safe level of $32,000. The lifeline is called "Switch the Question" (also known as a "Flip"), where the contestant may dismiss the current question, see the answer, and to play a new one worth the same dollar amount. However, they will not have any lifelines used on the discarded question returned to them.

The lifeline first appeared in the UK program in a number of celebrity editions, and most recently in its 300th episode in 2002. It was also used the US version from 2004–2008. The idea was taken from the UK show The People Versus.

The most notable change to the format is the addition of a bonus 16th question, which is worth $5 million. After answering question 15 correctly, they have the option of going for the bonus question. Contestants giving the correct answer win $5 million (the largest top prize in the history of Australian TV game shows). However, contestants giving an incorrect answer win $32,000; a difference of $968,000.

In the past, contestants that use the Phone a Friend lifeline had to give out three phone numbers to choose from. However, in some cases, their friends sometimes were ready to look up the answers (such as asking people around for them, or going online for the answers). In the 2007 version, since the show was live, whenever a contestant was in the studio, their three friends would be seated in another studio room (in a Channel 9 studio in their nearby city) and not see or hear any questions or answers. This prevented any unfair advantage as they can watch the show live and look up the answers online.

Also, if McGuire believes that the contestant is taking too long to make a decision, the contestant may be put on a shot clock of 60 seconds. If the shot clock expires, the contestant is forced to walk away with their current winnings. This rule was introduced because the format was live. The previous format was pre-recorded where the producers could edit the contestant's deliberations in case they were longer than the producers preferred. The host has to make the decision, which is unlike the US version, which adopted a fixed 15 second (first five), 30 seconds (second five), 45 seconds (questions 11–14) and total time saved plus 45 seconds (15th question) clock in 2008.

Another notable change is the elimination of the preliminary Fastest Finger First rounds, similar to the syndicated US show. McGuire simply calls out the contestant's name and the contestant will enter the set and immediately sit in the hot seat, as opposed to before when 10 contestants had to answer a question correctly in the fastest time to get into the hot seat.

The series ran for its scheduled 6 episodes from 22 October to 26 November 2007.

2010 specials 
On 27 February 2010, a primetime special called Whizz Kids: Who Wants to Be a Millionaire? was broadcast in which teams of students tried to win up to $1,000,000 for their school. Another episode was broadcast on 6 March 2010.

The special used the original format. Two lifelines also changed slightly. The Phone a Friend lifeline was called Phone the Teacher, students being able to call a teacher from their school. Also, as the show was prerecorded, the teachers had to be in a room where they could not see or hear the questions and answers in the studio to prevent them from looking up the answers through books or online or asking other teachers for the answer. The second lifeline change was that the Ask the Audience lifeline was called Ask the School, in which students from the contestants' school could vote using electronic keypads while they were watching the show being recorded. In addition, the "Switch the Question" lifeline was no longer available.

In total, the three schools, Engadine High School in NSW, Blackburn High School in Victoria and Frankston High School, also in Victoria, won $258,000 (the latter walked away with $8,000 whilst the remaining two schools won $125,000). The answers to the questions in which they walked away wounded up being wrong. Also, joke answers were introduced in these specials (most notably for the D choice), such as in a question about what attracts magnets in the second episode, a D) choice was offered as All the single ladies. For the record, the answer was 'iron' (but only after the Blackburn students asked the school).

Tony and John Koutsonikolas' $125,000 question, 6 March 2010 (used the 50:50 lifeline on the question)

Tony and John Koutsonikolas' $250,000 question

The boys chose not to answer, and left with $125,000, not wanting to risk $93,000.

2021 specials 
On 25 January 2021, the series returned for 4 primetime specials called Who Wants to Be a Millionaire? Special Events. The first episode featured frontline workers playing for the $1,000,000 prize, while later episodes featured celebrities and sports stars playing for charity.

Like the 2010 Whizz Kids specials, these also use the original format. The Fastest Finger First round returns after a nearly 15-year absence, this time with 6 contestants instead of 10. The Switch the Question lifeline returned, replacing Phone a Friend, while Ask the Audience was replaced with Ask the Host.

Payout structure 
Three different ladders have been used over the course of the series:

Lifelines 
During a contestant's game, they may make use of a set of lifelines to assist them on a question. Each lifeline may only be used once. Throughout the course of the show's history, these lifelines involve the following:
 50:50: (1999–2006, 2007, 2010, 2021): Two incorrect answers are eliminated, leaving the contestant with a choice between the correct answer and one remaining incorrect answer.
 Phone a Friend: (1999–2006, 2007, 2010): The contestant calls a pre-arranged friend and is given 30 seconds to discuss the question with that person.
 Ask the Audience: (1999–2006, 2007, 2010): Audience members use keypads to vote on what they believe to be the correct answer to the question they've been asked. The percentage of each option selected by the audience is displayed to the contestant and audience after this vote.
 Switch (2007, 2021): The computer replaces one question with another of the same monetary value. Any lifelines already used on the original question are not reinstated. In the 2007 version, this lifeline was earned after correctly answering the $32,000 question. In the 2021 specials, it was made available from the start.
 Ask the Host (2021): This lifeline allows the contestant to ask for the host's advice on the current question and give the best possible answer.

Hot Seat (2009 format) 

An abbreviated format of the show, Millionaire Hot Seat began production in 2009. Like the original Millionaire, it is hosted by Eddie McGuire. Airing daily at 5:00pm, it is currently in its thirteenth season.

Notable contestants

Celebrities 

Six celebrity contestants competed on a live episode of Millionaire on 17 July 2000: swimmer Nicole Livingstone (née Stevenson), actress Rachel Griffiths, television presenter Kerri-Anne Kennerley, English-Australian musician Red Symons (who lost on the $500,000 question), Irish-Australian comedian Jimeoin, and former Geelong AFL player-turned-commentator Sam Newman. On this particular episode, half of the contestants' totals were donated to charity while the other half was given to six at-home players. A total of $286,000 was raised during that episode, which was the first time in history that a live episode of Millionaire had aired anywhere in the world.

Other celebrity contestants to have competed on the show included:
 "Molly" Meldrum
 Shane Warne
 Pauline Hanson
 Alicia Molik
 Murray Cook
 Dame Edna Everage
 Paul "Fatty" Vautin
 Richard Hatch

Millionaires 
To date there have only been 4 millionaires, 2 on the regular version and 2 on Millionaire Hot Seat:
 Rob "Coach" Fulton: 17 October 2005

 Martin Flood: 14 November 2005 (Used the 50–50 lifeline in the final question)

Edwin Daly: 29 August 2016 (Third Australian Millionaire since Martin Flood won it in 2005, and the first on the Hot Seat version)

Antony McManus: 25 November 2021 (Fourth Australian Millionaire and the second on the Hot Seat version after Edwin Daly claimed the top prize

$1 million question incorrect 
To date only seven people have got the million dollar question wrong, all on Millionaire Hot Seat:
Barry Soraghan: 8 June 2009

Jeff Tarr: 28 September 2009

Paul Wolfenden: 14 June 2010

Jim Graham: 20 June 2011

Alan Edwards: 16 April 2012

Kevin Short: 13 May 2013

Craig Anderson: 1 October 2018

$500,000 question incorrect 
Red Symons: 17 July 2000

Mickey Pragnell: 2004

$250,000 question incorrect 
Stephen ?: 20 April 1999

Michael O’Conner: 12 November 2007

$500,000 winners 
 Trevor Sauer: 4 September 2000

 William Laing: 16 October 2000

 Dave and Denise Moser: 4 June 2001 (Used the 50–50 and Phone a Friend lifelines in the final question)

 Maria McCabe: 8 April 2002 (Used the 50–50 and Ask the Audience lifelines in the final question)

 Molly Meldrum: 28 April 2003

 Andrew Lockett: 8 September 2003 (Used the Phone a Friend lifeline in the final question)

 Scott Smith: 4 October 2004

 Shane Warne and Trevor Sauer: 14 February 2005 (Used the Phone a Friend lifeline in the final question)

 Clifford Plumpton: 27 June 2005

 Yael Blinco: 21 November 2005 ("Mummy Wants To Be A Millionaire" special)

Notes 
 a  Would have won $1,000,000 had they chosen to answer the question.

$250,000 winners 
 Paddy Spooner: 28 April 1999 (also appeared on the British version of the show where he won the same amount in pounds and the Irish version where he only won €1,000)

Spooner chose not to answer, winning $250,000.

 Brett McDonald: 3 July 2000

McDonald chose not to answer, winning $250,000. (He died in a car crash five months later after his appearance)

 Rob & Loretta Valenda: 12 March 2001

The Valendas chose not to answer, winning $250,000.

 Bruce Mump: November 2001
 Christopher Fare: 13 May 2002

Fare chose not to answer, winning $250,000, but had he been brave enough, could have played for the million.

 Bill Copland: 10 June 2002 (also appeared on the British version of the show where he won nothing).

Copland chose not to answer, winning $250,000, but had he been brave enough, could have played for the million.

 Tony Barber: 12 August 2002 (live "Battle of the Game Show Hosts" celebrity special)

Barber chose not to answer, winning $250,000.

 Jonathan Evans: 26 May 2003

Evans chose not to answer, winning $250,000, but had he been brave enough, could have played for the million.

 Tim Serisier: 2 June 2003

Serisier chose not to answer, winning $250,000, but had he been brave enough, could have played for the million.

 David Morgan: 8 March 2004

Morgan chose not to answer, winning $250,000, but had he been brave enough, could have played for the million.

 Rowan McGillicuddy: 28 June 2004

 Alan Tomlinson: 13 September 2004

 Kay Balzer: 2004
 Pauline Hanson and Christopher Fare: 14 February 2005
 Christopher Connolly: 5 September 2005
 Henry Kiss: 26 November 2007 (final ever show featuring the normal format)

Kiss chose not to answer, winning $250,000.

Controversies and other notable events 
In 2000, Richard Hatch became the first contestant in the Australian version to win nothing by bombing on his 4th question (see above). He was also the first, and so far only recorded case, of a celebrity contestant of the worldwide Millionaire franchise to win nothing. 
Paddy Spooner, who won $250,000 in 1999, also appeared on the British version of the show, also winning the same amount in pounds in 2000.
He was later the subject of an article in the Northampton Chronicle and Echo. The article stated that a syndicate, understood to have been run by quiz buff Paddy Spooner, aimed to exploit the selection procedure and increase the chances of beating 100,000 others in the race to appear on the show. The Chronicle & Echo had learned the syndicate accused of fast-tracking contestants on to the show managed to get hold of tie-breaker style questions likely to be used on phone lines rung by members of the public. Potential contestants were then told possible answers in return for a percentage of any future cash winnings.

Martin Flood cheating allegation 
In November 2005, Martin Flood became the show's second jackpot winner. However, it was alleged that he may have cheated in his first appearance of the show (similar to that of British cheat Charles Ingram); a suggestion Flood himself was unaware of until his jackpot win in the following episode. This investigation by A Current Affair helped to boost the ratings for the episode of his top prize win; however, after this, Flood was cleared by the Nine Network of any wrongdoing.

DVD 
On 27 October 2004, a Who Wants to Be a Millionaire? interactive multiplayer DVD game was released. Also a picture edition was also released in 2005 offering the choice of either adult and junior questions.

See also 
 Family Feud
Millionaire Hot Seat
1 vs. 100
The Weakest Link
 The Chase Australia
 Letters and Numbers
 Wheel of Fortune (Australian game show)

References

External links 
 
 Australian Game Shows

1990s Australian game shows
1999 Australian television series debuts
2000s Australian game shows
2006 Australian television series endings
2007 Australian television series debuts
2007 Australian television series endings
2010s Australian game shows
2010 Australian television series debuts
2010 Australian television series endings
2020s Australian game shows
2021 Australian television series debuts
2021 Australian television series endings
Australian television series based on British television series
English-language television shows
Nine Network original programming
Television series by Fremantle (company)
Television series by Reg Grundy Productions
Television series by Sony Pictures Television
Television shows set in Melbourne
Who Wants to Be a Millionaire?